Skáldatal (Catalogue of Poets) is a short prose work in Old Norse. It is preserved in two manuscripts: DG 11, or Codex Uppsaliensis, which is one of the four main manuscripts of the Prose Edda (first quarter of the 14th century), and AM 761 a 4to (about 1700), which also contains Skaldic poems. It lists the court poets of Scandinavian rulers from legendary times up to the late 13th century with short notes on some.

The work generally agrees with extant knowledge on court poets from other sources. Though, in some cases, more poets are known for a certain ruler than are listed in Skáldatal. In other cases, poets listed there are otherwise unknown.

Steinvör Sighvatsdóttir is the only woman listed in Skáldatal.

See also
 Skald
 Skaldic poetry

External links

 edition of Guðni Jónsson
 Page at the Skaldic Project

Skaldic poetry